John Jay Kleiner (February 8, 1845 – April 8, 1911) was an American educator and politician who served two terms as a U.S. Representative from Indiana 1883 to 1887.

Biography 
Born in West Hanover, Pennsylvania, Kleiner moved to Medina County, Ohio, in 1850 with his parents, who settled near Wadsworth.
He attended the public schools and assisted his father in agricultural pursuits.
During the Civil War Kleiner enlisted on June 20, 1863, in Company G, Eighty-sixth Regiment, Ohio Volunteer Infantry, and served until February 10, 1864.

He returned to Wadsworth, Ohio, where he resided until 1867. He moved to Evansville, Indiana, in 1867. He taught in the Evansville Business College and edited the Saturday Argus of that city.

Political career 
He served as member of the city council of Evansville in 1873. He engaged in the manufacture and sale of lumber. He served as mayor of Evansville 1874-1880.

Kleiner was elected as a Democrat to the Forty-eighth and Forty-ninth Congresses (March 4, 1883 – March 3, 1887). He was an unsuccessful candidate for reelection.

Later career and death 
He engaged in the real estate business and stock raising at Pierre, South Dakota, in 1887.

He moved to Washington, D.C., in 1890 and engaged in the real estate business until his death in Takoma Park, Maryland, April 8, 1911. He was interred at Rock Creek Cemetery in Washington.

References

1845 births
1911 deaths
People from Dauphin County, Pennsylvania
Union Army soldiers
Democratic Party members of the United States House of Representatives from Indiana
Mayors of Evansville, Indiana
19th-century American politicians